Jeffrey Charles William Michael Conaway (October 5, 1950 – May 27, 2011) was an American actor. He portrayed Kenickie in the film Grease and had roles in two television series: struggling actor Bobby Wheeler in Taxi and security officer Zack Allan on Babylon 5. Conaway was featured in the first and second seasons of the reality television series Celebrity Rehab with Dr. Drew.

Early life
Conaway was born in Manhattan, New York, and raised in the Astoria, Flushing and Forest Hills neighborhoods of Queens.

His father, Charles, was an actor, producer, and publisher. His mother, Helen, an actress who went by the stage name Mary Ann Brooks, taught music at New York City's Brook Conservatory. They divorced when he was three, and Conaway and his two older sisters lived with their mother.

He also spent time living with his grandparents in South Carolina, which gave him enough of a Southern accent that when he accompanied his mother to a casting call for director Arthur Penn's Broadway play All the Way Home, a story set in Knoxville, Tennessee, the 10-year-old Conaway landed a featured role as one of four boys. The 1961 Pulitzer Prize-winning play was nominated for a Tony Award for Best Play and ran 333 performances and one preview from November 29, 1960, to September 16, 1961. Conaway remained for the entire run, then toured with the national company of the play Critic's Choice.

Conaway worked as a child model, and attended high school at the Quintano School for Young Professionals. After playing with the rock band 3 1/2 beginning at age 15, he attended the North Carolina School of the Arts and later transferred to New York University.

Career
While at NYU, Conaway appeared in television commercials and had the lead in a school production of The Threepenny Opera. He made his film debut in the 1971 romantic drama Jennifer on My Mind, which also featured future stars Robert De Niro and Barry Bostwick.

Grease and Taxi
The following year, Conaway appeared in the original cast of the Broadway musical Grease, as an understudy to several roles including that of the lead male character, Danny Zuko, and eventually succeeded role-originator Barry Bostwick.

He played the role for 2 1/2 years while his friend John Travolta, with whom he shared a manager, later joined the show, playing the supporting role of Doody. The two would reunite in the 1978 motion picture musical Grease, in which Travolta played Zuko and Conaway his buddy Kenickie.

After breaking into series television in 1975 with Happy Days, followed by guest spots in several other TV shows, and three more films including Grease, he was cast as aspiring actor Bobby Wheeler on Taxi, which premiered in fall 1978.

He had appeared in an episode of The Mary Tyler Moore Show for the same producers, and, he said in 1987, had been considered for the role of John Burns, which eventually went to Randall Carver:

Conaway left Taxi after the third season. Part of the reason was his drug abuse after season one. Taxi writer Sam Simon recalled in 2008 that during production of Simon's first script for that show, a missing Conaway was found in his dressing room too high on drugs to perform. Conaway's dialogue for that episode was divided between his co-stars Danny DeVito and Christopher Lloyd, who delivered the jokes well enough so that Conaway's absence had little negative effect on the episode. This development caused the show's producers to realize that Conaway was expendable and contributed to his termination. Conaway was reported at the time to be dissatisfied with being typecast as a "blond bimbo" and the "butt of struggling-actor jokes," along with finding the nature of the role repetitive. He also felt creatively stymied:

After Taxi 
Conaway starred in the short-lived 1983 fantasy-spoof series Wizards and Warriors. He made guest appearances on such shows as Barnaby Jones, George & Leo, and Murder, She Wrote. He appeared in films such as Jawbreaker, Elvira: Mistress of the Dark, and Do You Wanna Know a Secret? 

From 1989 to 1990, he played Mick Savage on The Bold and the Beautiful. In 1993, he appeared onstage in Real Life Photographs. From 1994 to 1999, he played Sergeant, later promoted to Security Chief, Zack Allan on Babylon 5. In 2010 he provided voice-over for the English version of the animated short film Dante's Hell Animated (released in 2013), in which he is credited as "Hollywood legend Jeff Conaway".

Music career
In addition to acting, Conaway dabbled in music. In the mid-1960s, he was the lead singer and guitarist for a rock band, The 3 1/2, which recorded four singles for Cameo Records in 1966 and 1967:
 "Don't Cry to Me Babe" / "R & B In C" (Cameo 425, 1966)
 "Problem Child" / "Hey Mom Hey Dad" (Cameo 442, 1966)
 "Hey Gyp" / "Hey Kitty Cool Kitty" (Cameo 451, 1967) (This single was produced by Peter Noone of Herman's Hermits, who also wrote the B-side. The A-side is a song by Donovan.)
 "Angel Baby (Don't You Ever Leave Me)" / "You Turned Your Back on Love" (Cameo 485, 1967)

In 1979, Conaway recorded a self-titled debut album for Columbia Records. "City Boy" was released as a single. Bruce Springsteen's manager, Mike Appel, produced the album. In 2000, he released the album It Don't Make Sense You Can't Make Peace on the KEGMusic label.

Personal life

Marriages
Conaway was married three times. His first, short-lived marriage (when he was 21) was to a dancer he had been seeing for two years. It was annulled. His second marriage, from 1980 until their divorce in 1985, was to Rona Newton-John, elder sister of his Grease co-star, Olivia Newton-John. His stepson, Emerson Newton-John, is a race car driver. His third marriage was to Kerri Young from 1990 to 2000.

Health problems
After experiencing a crisis in the mid-1980s, Conaway came to grips with having a substance abuse problem. He underwent treatment in the late 1980s and often spoke candidly about his addictions.

By the mid-2000s he had relapsed. Conaway appeared in VH1's Celebrity Fit Club, but was forced to leave and entered rehabilitation. In early 2008, Conaway appeared with other celebrities in the VH1 reality series Celebrity Rehab with Dr. Drew. The show revealed that Conaway was addicted to cocaine, alcohol, and painkillers, and that he was in a codependent relationship with his girlfriend, who was also a user of prescription opiates. Conaway had suffered a back injury earlier in his career on the set of Grease while filming the "Greased Lightning" scene, which had been exacerbated recently by lifting boxes in his home, and he had turned to substances to manage the pain.

Conaway's appearance on the show's first and second seasons drew much attention because of his severely crippled state, his constant threats to leave the facility, and his frequent inability to speak clearly. Upon arrival at the Pasadena Recovery Center (which was filmed as part of Celebrity Rehab'''s first episode) Conaway, using a wheelchair, arrived drunk, mumbling to Drew Pinsky that he had binged on cocaine and Jack Daniel's whiskey the previous night.

During the second episode of Celebrity Rehab's first season, Conaway, fed up with his back pain, withdrawal symptoms, and the humiliation of having to be assisted while using the toilet, told Pinsky that he was thinking of killing himself. After Pinsky asked him to elaborate upon how he would carry out a suicidal act, Conaway glared at the mirror in his room and said, "I see myself breaking that mirror and slicing my fucking throat with it." During group sessions, Conaway revealed he was "tortured" during his childhood, as older boys in his neighborhood would put him into dangerous situations, tying him up and threatening him. He also related that he was molested when he was seven years old. Conaway stated that he had been an addict since he was a teenager.

With John Travolta's support, Conaway took courses and auditing from the Church of Scientology to cope with his drug problem and depression, although he did not intend to become a Scientologist.TV Guide; June 23, 2008; Page 8

In June 2009, Conaway joined Celebrity Rehab castmate Mary Carey at the premiere of her parody film Celebrity Pornhab with Dr. Screw.

In August 2009, Conaway was interviewed by Entertainment Tonight. In the interview, the actor claimed he was much better after a fifth back operation, and that he had yet to use painkillers again. He also discussed unscrupulous doctors and enablers.

In March 2010, shortly after the death of actor Corey Haim, Conaway told E! News that he had warned Haim about dying because of prescription drug abuse.

Death
On May 11, 2011, Conaway was found unconscious from what was initially described as an overdose of substances believed to be pain medication and was taken to Encino-Tarzana Regional Medical Center in Encino, California, where he was listed in critical condition. After initial reports, Drew Pinsky, who had treated Conaway for substance abuse, said the actor was suffering not from a drug overdose, but rather from pneumonia with sepsis, for which he was placed into an induced coma.

Though his drug use did not cause his pneumonia, it hampered Conaway's ability to recognize how severely ill he was and to seek treatment for pneumonia until it was too late.

On May 26, 2011, Conaway's family took him off life support after doctors determined they could do nothing to revive him. Conaway died the following morning at the age of 60. Conaway's doctor attributed his death to his addiction, stating, "What happens is, like with most opiate addicts, eventually they take a little too much ... and they aspirate so what's in their mouth gets into their lungs ... That's what happened with Jeff."

An autopsy performed on Conaway revealed that the actor died of various causes, including aspiration pneumonia and encephalopathy, attributable to drug overdoses.

Awards
Golden Globe Award
 1978 nomination, Best Supporting Actor, Comedy or Musical Series (for Taxi)
 1979 nomination, Best Supporting Actor, Comedy or Musical Series (for Taxi'')

Filmography

Film

Television

References

External links
 
 
 
 

1950 births
2011 deaths
20th-century American male actors
21st-century American male actors
American male child actors
American male film actors
American male stage actors
American male television actors
American male voice actors
Deaths from pneumonia in California
Deaths from sepsis
Drug-related deaths in California
Male actors from New York City
New York University alumni
Participants in American reality television series
People from Astoria, Queens
People from Flushing, Queens
People from Forest Hills, Queens
People from Manhattan
University of North Carolina School of the Arts alumni